Yenibahçe is a village in Silifke district of Mersin Province, Turkey. The population of Yenibahçe   is 360  as of 2011.

References

Villages in Silifke District